Bruce William Taylor (14 June 1924 – 16 October 1984) was an Australian cricketer. He played in one first-class match for Queensland in 1949/50.

See also
 List of Queensland first-class cricketers

References

External links
 

1924 births
1984 deaths
Australian cricketers
Queensland cricketers
Cricketers from Brisbane
Royal Australian Navy personnel of World War II
Royal Australian Navy officers